Solntsevo may refer to:
Solntsevo (inhabited locality), several inhabited localities in Russia
Solntsevo District, a district in Western Administrative Okrug of Moscow, Russia
Solntsevo (locomotive depot), a future depot of Sokolnicheskaya Line of the Moscow Metro
Solntsevo (Moscow Metro), a planned station of Kalininsko-Solntsevskaya Line of the Moscow Metro

See also
Solntsevsky District, a district of Kursk Oblast, Russia
Solntsevsky District, Moscow, a district of the city of Moscow in 1984—1991